Joseph Amadeus Fleck (August 25, 1892 – April 5, 1977) was an American painter and muralist. His works include The Red Man of Oklahoma Sees the First Stage Coach, in Hugo, Oklahoma, and First Mail Crossing Raton Pass and Unloading the Mail in Raton, in Raton, New Mexico.

Biography
Joseph A. Fleck was born in Austria in 1892 and received his academic training at the Royal Viennese Art Academy and Royal Art Academy in Munich. He moved to Kansas City, Missouri in 1922 and then settled in Taos, New Mexico in 1925. From 1942 to 1946 he was Dean of Fine Arts and artist in residence at the University of Missouri in Kansas City.

Awards
Arizona State Fair, First Prize, 1928
Kansas City Art Institute, 1923, 1929, 1934  (prize)
Art Institute of Chicago, 1927 (prize)

Notes

References

Further reading

External links
Works by Joseph Fleck in the Smithsonian American Art Museum

1892 births
1977 deaths
20th-century American painters
American male painters
Artists from Taos, New Mexico
American muralists
Section of Painting and Sculpture artists
Federal Art Project artists
Treasury Relief Art Project artists
American people of Austrian descent
20th-century American male artists